Mary Louise Dudziak (born 1956), is an American legal theorist, civil rights historian, educator, and a leading foreign policy and international relations expert. She is the Asa Griggs Candler Professor of Law at Emory University.

Her research has examined the intersection of race, civil rights, and the surprising influence of Cold War politics in accelerating the passage of the Civil Rights Act of 1964. Dudziak is also a leading biographical scholar of former Supreme Court Justice Thurgood Marshall. Her work has examined his role and influence in spreading American legal ideals and values abroad.

Career 
Before joining Emory University, Dudziak was the Judge Edward J. and Ruey L. Guirado Professor of Law, History and Political Science at the University of Southern California Gould School of Law, where she held joint appointments in USC's Department of History and Political Science. Prior to USC Law, she was a professor of Law and History at the University of Iowa, and a law clerk for Judge Sam J. Ervin, III, of the Fourth US Circuit Court of Appeals. Dudziak has also been a distinguished visiting law professor at Harvard University, Duke University, and at the University of Maryland.

Publications 
September 11 in History: A Watershed Moment? (2003)
Legal Borderlands: Law and the Construction of American Borders (2006)
Cold War Civil Rights: Race and the Image of American Democracy (2011)
Exporting American Dreams: Thurgood Marshall's African Journey (2011)
War Time: An Idea, Its History, Its Consequences (2012)
Cold War Civil Rights: The Relationship between Civil Rights and Foreign Affairs in the Truman Administration (1992) (dissertation)

References 

1956 births
Living people
USC Gould School of Law faculty
Emory University faculty
Yale Graduate School of Arts and Sciences alumni
University of California, Berkeley alumni
Yale Law School alumni
American women biographers
American women historians
21st-century American women writers
21st-century American historians